Tanana River Bridge is a bridge over the Tanana River in Alaska, United States.

It is planned as a combined road and railroad bridge, but the first years it will be a road bridge only. The extension of Alaska Railroad to Delta Junction is planned to use the bridge. More than half of the funding came from the Department of Defence, since it connects to military facilities on the west side of the river.

See also
The Mears Memorial Bridge for the Alaska Railroad over the Tanana river at Nenana is sometimes called the Tanana River Bridge
The  bridge of the George Parks Highway next to the Mears Memorial Bridge, is also sometimes called the Tanana River Bridge

References

Railroad bridges in Alaska
Road bridges in Alaska
2014 establishments in Alaska